Mudhoney is a grunge band from Seattle, Washington. "Mudhoney" may also refer to:
 
Mudhoney (film), a film directed by Russ Meyer
Mudhoney Records, a record label
"Mudhoney", song by Teenage Fanclub, on their album The King
"Mudhoney" or "Mud Honey", Mud flap on a truck or other vehicle displaying the silhouette of a female figurine.